The Port of Montevideo, in the northern part of the Old City of Montevideo, Uruguay, is one of the major ports of South America and plays a very important role in the economy of Uruguay. Notably the port includes a number of important facilities including one the countries main tourism terminals and the La Teja Refinery which processes the bulk of the countries oil.

History

Montevideo Bay is one of the reasons the city was founded. It gives natural protection to ships, although there are now two jetties that protect the harbour entrance of the waves. This natural port makes it competitive with the Río de la Plata's other great South American port—the Port of Buenos Aires.

The main engineering changes occurred between the years 1870 and 1930. During this period, built the first wooden pier, several deposits in La Aguada, north and south Rambla, a river port, a new pier, the river basin, and the La Teja Refinery. A major storm in 1923 meant that many engineering works in the city had to be repaired. Since the second half of the 20th century, physical changes have ceased, after which came a degradation of the area due to national economic stagnation.

Development
The port's proximity has contributed to the installation of various industries in the area surrounding the bay, particularly import/export businesses, and business related to port activity and naval activity. Because of the density of industrial development in the area surrounding the port, the residential popularity is relatively low. The main environmental problems are subaquatic sedimentation and air and water contamination.

The port has been growing rapidly and consistently at an average annual rate of 14 percent due to an increase in foreign trade. The city has received a $20 million loan from the Inter-American Development Bank to modernize the port, increase its size and efficiency, and lower maritime and river transportation costs.

Katoen Natie owns an important container handling facility at this Port.

References

External links

 

Ciudad Vieja, Montevideo
Transport in Montevideo
Ports and harbours of Uruguay